Roy David Williams is a physicist and data scientist. He is a professor at Caltech and is most known for his work with the LIGO, and VOTable and VOEvent standards. He is a proponent of open data.

Selected research
Fox, Geoffrey C., Roy D. Williams, and Paul C. Messina. Parallel computing works!. Elsevier, 2014.
Giavalisco, M., et al. "The great observatories origins deep survey: initial results from optical and near-infrared imaging." The Astrophysical Journal Letters 600.2 (2004): L93.
Williams, Roy D. "Performance of dynamic load balancing algorithms for unstructured mesh calculations." Concurrency: Practice and experience 3.5 (1991): 457-481.

References

External links

California Institute of Technology faculty
Data scientists
Living people
Year of birth missing (living people)